Hearts and Knives is the fourth studio album by the British rock/pop band Visage. It was released on 20 May 2013 and was the band's first album of new material in 29 years.

Background 

In January 2013, Visage announced their new line-up to consist of vocalist and founding member Steve Strange, bassist Steve Barnacle (who had worked with the band on their 1984 album Beat Boy), Robin Simon (former guitarist in Ultravox and Magazine) and Lauren Duvall on vocals. The band's official website confirmed that former Visage/Magazine keyboardist Dave Formula and former Simple Minds keyboardist Mick MacNeil have also contributed to the album.

Album cover 

The make-up and "Fade to Grey"-style mask seen on the front cover were created by Lara Himpelmann, and the cover shot was taken by photographer Peter Ashworth, who supplied the black and white photograph that artist Iain Gillies utilized to paint the picture that was the cover of Visage's debut album in 1980. The new logo and graphics have been designed by The Nick Foot Studio.

Release 

A single, "Shameless Fashion", was released as a digital download in April 2013 and followed by a physical CD-single release on 6 May.

Hearts and Knives was released on 20 May 2013 through the band's own label Blitz Club.

A second single, "Dreamer I Know", was released on 23 July 2013. A promo video for the single (the band's first since 1984) was produced. The single includes the non-album track entitled "Digital Age". The third single from the album, "Never Enough", was released on 9 December 2013, with a vinyl release to follow in January 2014. The fourth single from the album, "Hidden Sign", was released as a CD-single and a download on 23 May 2014 with a 12" vinyl single available from Rough Trade Records. The fifth and final single from the album, "She's Electric (Coming Around)", was released in August 2014.

Reception 

Lydia Jenkin of The New Zealand Herald called it "a solid album steeped in nostalgia. [...] But really, it's one for the fans – and those needing an early-'80s fix." Record Collector's review commented "the new Visage album sounds like the past 30 years failed to happen," and called it "a supremely engaging diversion."

Track listing 

 "Never Enough" (John Bryan, Rich Mowatt, Robin Simon, Sare Havlicek, Steve Strange)
 "Shameless Fashion" (Ben Woods, Bryan, Nigel Summers, Mowatt, Simon, Strange)
 "She's Electric (Coming Around)" (Bryan, Josh Legg, Kyle Petersen, Mick MacNeil, Strange)
 "Hidden Sign" (Bryan, Julie Scott, Mowatt, Havlicek, Steve Barnacle, Strange)
 "On We Go" (Guy Hatfield, Bryan, John Graham, Simon, Strange)
 "Dreamer I Know" (Arno Carstens, Bryan, Martin Glover, MacNeill, Strange)
 "Lost in Static" (Christian Kennerney, Greg Benns, Bryan, Marco di Carlo, Strange)
 "I Am Watching" (Bryan, Graham, Simon, Havlicek, Strange)
 "Diaries of a Madman" (Dave Formula, Ross Tregenza, Strange)
 "Breathe Life" (Barnacle, Strange)

Personnel 

 Visage

 Steve Strange – vocals
 Steve Barnacle – bass
 Robin Simon – guitar
 Lauren Duvall – vocals

 Additional personnel

 Dave Formula – keyboards
 Mick MacNeil – keyboards
 Logan Sky – keyboards
 Rich Mowatt – keyboards
 John Bryan – additional backing vocals
 Sare Havlicek – keyboards, drums
 "Wildcat" Will Blanchard – drums
 Nigel Summers – additional guitar ("Shameless Fashion")

References

External links 

 

Visage (band) albums
2013 albums